Bertil Sollevi (born 15 February 1956) is a Swedish weightlifter. He competed at the 1980 Summer Olympics and the 1984 Summer Olympics.

References

1956 births
Living people
Swedish male weightlifters
Olympic weightlifters of Sweden
Weightlifters at the 1980 Summer Olympics
Weightlifters at the 1984 Summer Olympics
Sportspeople from Malmö
20th-century Swedish people
21st-century Swedish people